Lord Simcoe Hotel was one of many now vanished hotels in Toronto, Ontario, Canada. Built in 1956, the 20-storey concrete and glass modernist structure was designed by Henry T. Langston and Peter Dickinson. The hotel was named for John Graves Simcoe, Lieutenant Governor of Upper Canada and a resident of York, Upper Canada (now Toronto). The name was somewhat incorrect as Simcoe was never called himself a Lord.

Located on the northeast corner of King Street and University Avenue (150 King Street West), it was closed in 1979 and torn down in 1981. It was replaced by the Sun Life Centre East Tower in 1984. The hotel was unable to compete with other downtown hotels due to a lack of central air conditioning and convention space. It consistently lost money over its 24-year existence.

References
"Lord Simcoe workers say goodbye to hotel that fell behind the times." The Globe and Mail. Oct 29, 1979. pg. P.5
"Lord Simcoe Hotel to be closed, torn down land to bring record $317 per square foot." Jack Willoughby. The Globe and Mail. Aug 4, 1979. pg. B.14

External links
Image of the hotel

Hotel buildings completed in 1956
Demolished buildings and structures in Toronto
Hotels in Toronto
Defunct hotels in Canada
Modernist architecture in Canada
Peter Dickinson (architect) buildings
Buildings and structures demolished in 1981
Demolished hotels
Former skyscrapers